The SNCF BB 26000 locomotives are a class of dual voltage, four axle B'B' electric locomotives capable of a top speed of 200 km/h built by GEC Alsthom between 1988 and 1998 for SNCF. The locomotives are also commonly known as the Sybics.

Design and development

The locomotives are a two cabin design with the body built out of steel, two pantographs are fitted; one for 1500 V operation, the other for 25 kV operation. A 25 kV AC supply is stepped down and rectified to 1500 V, a 1500 V supply feeds the power electronics directly. Each of the three elements of the thyristor bridge based three phase inverter circuits are connected in parallel, with the two three phase supplies per motor being series connected. For speeds below  one supply voltage reducing chopper circuit (French:hacheur) per motor bogie is used to assist control. The power electronics of the two motor bogies are connected in parallel, and are evaporatively cooled by boiling Freon 113.

The bogies are a monomoteur design, with helical spring primarily suspension.

The traction motors are three phase synchronous type (as used in the contemporary TGV Atlantique) but with two three phase stator windings offset by 30 degrees. Drive from the traction motors to wheel is via a floating ring vibration isolation element (French:anneau dansant) and hollow shaft drive.

Mono-motor bogies were chosen based on the good performance in the SNCF BB 22200, SNCF BB 15000 and SNCF BB 7200 classes. A synchronous motor was chosen over a commutated motor or an asynchronous motor due to the reduced mass, simplicity of equipment, and price.

Two locomotives SNCF BB 20011 and 20012 were used to develop and test the dual voltage traction system, microprocessor control systems and auxiliary motors, BB 20012 was used to develop and test the pneumatic and electrical braking system.

The Paris-based industrial design group MBD Design contributed to the design of the locomotive.

History and operations
264 of the class were ordered by SNCF, only 234 were built, the last 30 of the order were instead built as a new triple voltage design capable of also operating on 3 kV DC; these used asynchronous electric motors and became the SNCF Class BB 36000 (Asytrit).

The class have been used in most regions of France.

In June 2000 26084 was involved in an accident caused by sabotage near Chasse-sur-Rhône, and is no longer in service. As of 2009 the remaining 233 machines are still in operation in France.

Liveries
The locomotives were originally delivered in an orange and grey livery. Other liveries carried include the Fret SNCF green livery, the red and grey multiservice and TER Alsace liveries and the purple and silver En voyage livery.

Miniature models
The locomotives have been reproduced as models in HO scale by Roco, Märklin, Jouef and Trix, and by PIKO in HO and N scales.

Notes

References

External links

Images
 
 
 
Fleet list
 

26000
Alstom locomotives
B-B locomotives
Railway locomotives introduced in 1988
Standard gauge electric locomotives of France
1500 V DC locomotives
25 kV AC locomotives
Multi-system locomotives
Passenger locomotives